"Horsing Around with History" is a 32-page Disney comics story starring Scrooge McDuck, written by Carl Barks and drawn by William Van Horn. It was published in Uncle Scrooge Adventures #33 (1995). This was Barks' next-to-last story released in the United States.  Barks came out of retirement to provide a script for this story and he chose William Van Horn to illustrate this story for him. This story was originally written to celebrate the 30th anniversary of Carl Barks' retirement.

It was also later printed in the Carl Barks Library of Uncle Scrooge Adventures in Color #56. Carl Barks wrote the script, but the actual story was drawn and lettered by William Van Horn.

Plot 
Scrooge, Donald and the nephews Huey, Dewey and Louie are off to find ancient sunken treasure from the time of the Trojan War, unaware that the Beagle Boys are spying on them. The Ducks find the legendary Trojan Horse, but all the while they are followed by an albatross, which serves as a spy for the Beagle Boys.

See also
List of Disney comics by Carl Barks

References

External links

Disney comics stories
Donald Duck comics by Carl Barks
1995 in comics